Time and the Wind is a 2013 Brazilian epic drama film based on a series of novels written by the Brazilian author Erico Verissimo. The film was directed by Jayme Monjardim and starring Thiago Lacerda, Marjorie Estiano, Fernanda Montenegro, and Cléo Pires.

Plot 
Based on the novel trilogy of the same name, by Erico Verissimo, Time and the Wind follows 150 years of  family Terra Cambará and their opponent Amaral family. The history of struggles between the two families begins by the time of the Jesuit Missions and runs until the end of the 19th century. The film also features the period of formation of the State of Rio Grande do Sul and the dispute of territory between the Portuguese and Spanish crowns.

Cast 

Thiago Lacerda as Capitão Rodrigo Cambará
Cléo Pires as Ana Terra 
Suzana Pires as Ana Terra 
Fernanda Montenegro as Bibiana Terra Cambará
Marjorie Estiano as Bibiana Terra Cambará
Janaína Kremer as Bibiana Terra Cambará
Luiz Carlos Vasconcelos as Maneco
César Troncoso as Father Alonzo
Leonardo Machado as Marciano Bezerra
José de Abreu as Ricardo Amaral
Paulo Goulart as Ricardo Amaral Neto
Leonardo Medeiros as Bento Amaral
Cris Pereira as Juvenal Terra 
Marat Descartes as Licurgo
Vanessa Lóes as Maria Valéria
Mayana Moura as Luzia
Igor Rickli as Bolívar
Rafael Cardoso as Florêncio
Matheus Costa as Pedro Missioneiro 
Martín Rodríguez as Pedro Missioneiro 
Áurea Baptista as Arminda
Cyria Coentro as Henriqueta Terra

Awards 
 Best Film, Trophy Lente de Cristal - V Cinefest Brasil/Montevideo.

References

External links
 

Brazilian historical drama films
Films set in Brazil
Films set in the 19th century
Films about gauchos
Films based on works by Erico Verissimo
2010s Portuguese-language films
Historical epic films
2010s historical drama films
Brazilian nonlinear narrative films
2013 drama films
2013 films